Ștefan Petrache (8 May 1949 – 13 January 2020) was a Moldovan singer who was a member of bands Noroc, Contemporanul, Plai and others.

Petrache was born in Vînători, Nisporeni. He worked at Teleradio-Moldova and spent thirty-two years on the music scene and on tour. In 2014 he received the Moldovan Order of the Republic for his contribution to music. He died in Chișinău, aged 70.

References

1949 births
2020 deaths
20th-century Moldovan male singers